Duke Ling may refer to these ancient Chinese rulers:

Duke Ling of Jin (died 607 BC)
Duke Ling of Qi (died 554 BC)
Duke Ling of Wey (died 492 BC)
Duke Ling of Qin (died 415 BC)

See also
King Ling (disambiguation)